The canton of La Ferté-Macé is an administrative division of the Orne department, northwestern France. Its borders were modified at the French canton reorganisation which came into effect in March 2015. Its seat is in La Ferté-Macé.

It consists of the following communes:
 
Banvou
Beauvain
Bellou-en-Houlme
La Coulonche
Dompierre
Échalou
La Ferrière-aux-Étangs
La Ferté-Macé
Lonlay-le-Tesson
Messei
Les Monts d'Andaine
Saint-André-de-Messei
Saires-la-Verrerie

References

Cantons of Orne